Moldova competed at the 2004 Summer Paralympics in Athens, Greece. The team included 3 athletes, all males  but won no medals.

Sports

Athletics

Men's track

Powerlifting

See also
Moldova at the Paralympics
Moldova at the 2004 Summer Olympics

References 

Nations at the 2004 Summer Paralympics
2004
Summer Paralympics